Neuekrug is a village and a former municipality in the district Altmarkkreis Salzwedel, in Saxony-Anhalt, Germany. Since 1 January 2010, it is part of the municipality Diesdorf. The municipality consisted of the three villages Höddelsen, Reddigau and Neuekrug. The Salzwedel Dumme river rises near Neuekrug-Höddelsen.

Former municipalities in Saxony-Anhalt
Altmarkkreis Salzwedel